Priest Neal's Mass House and Mill Site, also known as Paradice, is a historic Roman Catholic Church located at Bel Air, Harford County, Maryland.  It is a stuccoed, -story stone dwelling constructed about 1743 by Jesuits for use as a mission before Roman Catholics obtained freedom of worship under the United States Constitution.  The interior floor plan is unique in its combined function as Jesuit priests' residence and house of worship: an unusually wide center hall provided meeting space and was flanked by two chambers on the west and a large reception room on the east. On the banks of Deer Creek, is the site of an 18th-century mill which the priests used to generate money to support their endeavors.  It is one of the oldest extant buildings associated with the Catholic Church in America.

It was listed on the National Register of Historic Places in 1990.

See also
 List of Jesuit sites

References

External links
, including photo from 1976, at Maryland Historical Trust

Former Roman Catholic church buildings in Maryland
Churches in Harford County, Maryland
Churches on the National Register of Historic Places in Maryland
Churches completed in 1743
Buildings and structures in Bel Air, Harford County, Maryland
18th-century Roman Catholic church buildings in the United States
National Register of Historic Places in Harford County, Maryland
1743 establishments in Maryland